The Japanese manga series One-Punch Man contains a number of fictional characters created by One and illustrated by Yusuke Murata. The series follows a superhero named Saitama and his disciple Genos who join the Hero Association so they can be recognized as such when they fight various monsters and villains. The Hero Association ranks all of its members by a Class and a ranking within that class. Characters listed are ones noted by the author in the manga profiles, ones that were highlighted in the anime character list, and ones that recur over several story arcs.

Main characters

Saitama

The title character, is a bald-headed 25-year-old  man who is bored of fighting because he is able to effortlessly defeat enemies with a single punch. He lives in an apartment in City Z. Three years prior to the start of the series, when he still had hair, Saitama was job hunting when he defeated the powerful supervillain Crablante that attempted to kill a child with a butt-chin. Saitama says he became a hero "for the fun of it". His abilities mainly consist of physical abilities magnified to an immeasurable degree: strength is the true power of Saitama, with speed, stamina, and durability being mere side-effects. He attributes this to a daily training regimen like 100 push-ups, 100 sit-ups, 100 squats, a 10 km run, eating healthy food, and abstaining from use of the air conditioner or heater in order to reinforce his mental fortitude. He also mentions training even when his body was wounded and made strange cracking sounds. Three years of this spartan training pushed Saitama to his limits, making him evidently unbeatable. Early in the series, he picks up a disciple and roommate, Genos.

Though he had broken all the physical records in the Hero entrance exam by huge margins, Saitama enters the Hero Association with a score of 71, giving him one of the lowest ranks in the Hero Association. This is due to his miserable performance on the mental exam. He soon goes up the ranks by performing many deeds, although many of his efforts are not recognized because of collateral damage or higher-tiered superheroes receiving more credit. These include defeating the raging ninja supervillain/assassin known as Speed-o’-Sound Sonic (who became his unlikely rival) and destroying a meteor similar to Chicxulub, each with a single punch. As of the current arc of the webcomic by ONE, he is A-Class rank 39. Regardless of his rank, he does not mind giving others the credit, as demonstrated in his actions following the fight against the Deep Sea King. In the Dark Matter Thieves' story arc, he is unfazed by the telekinesis of a powerful esper, further displaying his resistance. This arc was also one of the only times he has used his "serious punch", defeating the world-conquering leader of the aliens, Lord Boros. It was also revealed that Saitama's power can continue to grow limitless as demonstrated during his fight with Cosmic Garou, with the latter leaving him behind on the power scaling through every blows exchanged. Through various circumstances, he forms friendships with Mumen Rider, Bang, King, Genos, and Blizzard.

Saitama is voiced by Makoto Furukawa in the Japanese version and by Max Mittelman in the English dub.

Genos
 is a 19-year-old cyborg who becomes Saitama's disciple after bearing witness to Saitama's easy victory over Mosquito Girl. Four years prior to the start of the storyline, his family was killed by a rampaging cyborg known as Mad Cyborg. Genos was nearly killed in the attack and his body was destroyed, so to keep him alive, a scientist named Dr. Kuseno took Genos in and modified his body to make him a cyborg with destructive capabilities. Ever since, Genos has been obsessively searching for traces of Mad Cyborg, vying vengeance. Immediately prior to the main story, Dr. Kuseno argues that Genos should move on from his obsession with Mad Cyborg, but Genos remains steadfastly convinced that justice demands the destruction of the cyborg. His perfect score on the entrance exam for the Hero Association places him in the highest class, S-Class, far above Saitama's placement in C-Class, but he still considers Saitama to be his master and goes with him whenever he is not summoned to other missions. Saitama often has to save him, as Genos' headstrong personality causes him to jump into action without thinking. He lives with Saitama after offering a sizable down payment for his share of the rent. His superhero name in the Hero Association is 

Genos is voiced by Kaito Ishikawa in the Japanese version and by Zach Aguilar in the English dub.

Hero Association
The  is a superhero organization founded by the multi-millionaire Agoni in order to fight monsters, criminals, and various threats. It uses a Hero Registry to indicate which characters are recognized as professional heroes, with anyone who is not registered to be considered "a pervy freak who spouts irresponsible nonsense." Agoni created the association after his grandson was saved from the monster Crablante by an unknown bystander (who turns out to be Saitama). It is also financed by donations from citizens. The association is made up of four tiers from the lowest C-Class to the highest S-Class. The heroes within each class are ranked numerically, with the first ranked hero of each class being eligible to advance to the next tier if they so desire. New heroes must take an exam in which 50% is a physical test, and the other 50% is a written exam and an essay. A passing grade would be 70% or higher and directly placed in a class from 70% being barely C-class to 100% being eligible for S-class. They are then placed at the lowest ranking for that tier. Heroes can ascend or descend in their rankings depending on their deeds, and C-Class heroes who are inactive for a week are dropped from the Registry.

S-Class Superheroes

S-Class is the highest hero rank in the Hero Association. Those who have gotten a perfect score on the entrance exam, as well as the top candidate from A-Class, are eligible to enter this class. Besides Genos, the S-Class Superheroes in the series are, in rank order:

Blast
 is the top superhero in the Hero Association who can also use a teleportation suit. His whereabouts are currently unknown and he is said to make himself known when a threat to humanity arises. He is revealed to be part of a group of universal guardians who had for years been hunting down a series of mysterious God's cubes which scattered across the universe including planet Earth, in order to prevent people from coming into contact with the cubes and becoming Mysterious Beings. Among the members Blast team-up with resembles one of Saitama's past foes, such as Boros and Beast King. Terrible Tornado and Sitch were some of the first people to know who he is and what he looks like. Blast once fought Centichoro, a powerful, giant centipede, and brought it to the brink of death. He also fought the Ninja Village Leader at one point, resulting in the Leader being rendered comatose for 15 years. He also saved Amai Mask and became his idol.

During the Hero Association's assault on the Monster Association's headquarters in the present, Blast finally appears to take one of God's cubes which Saitama found at a collapsing underground location where Saitama is trapped alongside Flashy Flash and a one-eyed female monster Manako. Blast helps the two heroes and the small monster out of the rubble. When God attempts to corrupt Tornado by mimicking Blast's appearance, Tornado is able to resist it as the real Blast is nearby, which causes God to retreat. Because his mission hunting the cubes is very important, Blast had been rarely available during the Hero Association's tasks. Having transported Saitama and Garou to fight in Jupiter, Blast and his fellow guardians' doings helps Garou to realize his mistakes, allowing Saitama to travel back in time to save not just Garou from himself, but also the universe.

Blast is also revealed to have a son named Blue, who is a co-founder of Neo Heroes, and wants to surpass his father.

Tornado 
, at rank 2, is the top female superhero. She is a petite 28-year-old woman with curly green hair, whose youthful appearance and short stature leads others to confuse her for a lost little girl. As an esper, she can perform psychic maneuvers such as telekinesis and levitation. She has a younger sister named Blizzard. In the battle with the Dark Matter Thieves, she easily turns a multitude of shells shot from a large alien ship back onto itself, dealing tremendous damage. Other espers are generally dwarfed by her overpowering telekinesis, and she has an abusive personality, often lashing out at people. Blast is the only individual who Tornado sees in high regard and she awaits his return. She owed Blast for saving her life and renewed her motivation to protect her only family, Blizzard.

In the anime, Tornado is voiced by Aoi Yūki in the Japanese version and by Marieve Herington in Season 1 and Corina Boettger in Season 2 of the English dub.

Bang 
, who goes by the hero name , at rank 3, is an expert martial artist who runs a dojo in City Z. Back when he was young, Bang used to utilize a forbidden martial arts style  selfishly until his brother, Bomb, redeems him. Inspired by his brother's fighting style, Bang abandoned the forbidden style and invented  with a similar caliber as the style Bomb uses, and joins Hero Association in the present prior to Saitama's registration to the organization. Thanks to Bomb, Bang becomes wise and displays a great deal of patience when compared to others in S-Class, and often scolds other heroes for being haughty or selfish, just as he was back in his youth. His sole student is Charanko, owing to the fact that he had a former disciple named Garo who beat down his other students including Sourface until they quit, and Bang was too late to stop Garo from learning his former fighting style. The incident of Garo walking a similar path as Bang had is a painful memory for the latter, and as a result, he constantly looks for new disciples to pass his martial arts on to, as Charanko is fairly incompetent. He is one of the first heroes to recognize Saitama's true power, witnessing him destroying a meteor that would otherwise destroy Z-City. After Future Garou sends Future Saitama to stop the former's past-self and successfully redeems him, Bang reconciles with his former student, and helps his rehabilitation while retiring from the association.

In the anime, he is voiced by Kazuhiro Yamaji in the Japanese version and by Will Barrett in the English dub.

Atomic Samurai  
, who goes by his hero name , rank 4, is a samurai hero who sports a kimono with an atom symbol on the back of it, as well as a member of the Council of Swordsmasters. He initially refuses to shake Saitama's hand as he isn't S-class, and when Saitama calls him "middle-aged", he replies that he is only 37. Atomic Samurai is highly skilled with his katana, being able to cut enemies down into millions of pieces in an instant. Within confined spaces, he wields his sword with such precision and speed that enemies are deatomized. He has several students who fill A-Class ranks 2, 3, and 4. He is part of a group called the Holy Order Of The Sword, along with Nichirin, Amahare, and Zanbai, each an exceptionally skilled sword-wielder. After the deaths of previous swordsmen trios at the hands of a toxic form of a monster Fuhrer Ugly, Kamikaze is entrusted by a dying Nichirin with one of the two Sacred Blades, the Sun Blade, and becoming a new leader of the order, with a mission to search Moon Blade, once the war against Monster Association is over.

In the anime, he is voiced by Kenjiro Tsuda in the Japanese version and by Kyle Hebert in the English dub.

Child Emperor 
, rank 5, is a ten-year-old boy who wears a Japanese-style elementary school backpack.. He is a genius inventor who uses robots to fight as well as using his backpack to sprout spider-like legs that enable him to ambulate. In the bonus chapter "Numbers", he devises a mask which functions as a scanner for the heroes and monsters' power levels. In Vol. 12, he fights a giant Medusa-like monster Ganriki with one of his robots called Dogman. Various other gadgets have been displayed, each with a unique function tailored to fighting certain enemies. Though he is the youngest of the S-Class heroes, he displays a level of maturity exceeding most of his peers'. He was formerly Dr. Bofoi's assistant.

In the anime, he is voiced by Minami Takayama in the Japanese version and by Sara Cravens in the English dub.

Metal Knight 
, who goes by the hero name  is a scientist who uses various remote-controlled robots to fight with high destructive capability. His robot first appears at Z City, where he tests a new weapon against an incoming meteor, but it fails while also turning down a collaboration with Genos. He is introduced as S-Class, Rank 7, but after being credited for stopping the meteor, advances to rank 6. He is absent at most S-Class meetings, but his robots often appear to salvage parts from destroyed enemies. Drive Knight advises Genos to be wary of Metal Knight, hinting at a connection between Dr. Bofoi and the cyborg that destroyed one of the hometowns where Genos, Drive Knight and Kuseno use to live respectively. Dr. Bofoi reconstructs the Hero Association building into a fortress.

Metal Knight is voiced by Tesshō Genda in the Japanese version and by Jamieson Price in the English dub.

King
, ranked 7 at the time of the S-class meeting, is a hero with large claw-scars down the left side of his face. Genos believes that he is the strongest man on the planet and that the other S-class members show him great respect. In actuality, he is an ordinary 29-year-old otaku lacking superpowers and loves playing dating sims and fighting games. When King was younger, he was attacked by a Tiger-level monster which clawed his face. But when a younger Saitama defeated it, King was given credit, due to Saitama's lack of registration with the Hero Association. Other similar "victories" depicted show that Saitama and other circumstances cause high-level demons to die near him, and he often receives all the credit. As a result, he was placed in S-Class. King did not protest due to the S-Class perks and wealth, soon becoming one of the most popular heroes. King is often targeted by monsters and assassins; however, due to his luck, his enemies overestimate him and end up running away because of his presence. People have given his special technique a nickname, the "King Engine", which in actuality is his heart beating so loudly and quickly that enemies are scared away. Although Saitama knows of King's lack of abilities, he does not mind giving King the credit, instead, encouraging King to keep inspiring people as an S-Class hero. King and Saitama become friends and often visit each other to play video games. As he was present during Saitama's past life when the latter saved his life, King is the only person who remembers when Saitama had hair, prior to the latter acquiring his powers at the cost of baldness.

King is voiced by Hiroki Yasumoto in the Japanese version and by Rich Brown in the English dub.

Zombieman
, at rank 8, is a zombie hero with short black hair and wears a jacket. He is a practically immortal hero who can regenerate from any wound. It is later revealed that he was a former test subject of the House of Evolution, having planned to get revenge on them until he abandoned his personal matter when he learned Saitama is the main reason the organization have fallen, and reformed as a food shop.

His innate fighting abilities are nonexistent compared to those of the other S-Class heroes, so he utilizes his regeneration for unconventional tactics that pinpoint the opponent's weaknesses. Battles against him often devolve into wars of attrition.

In the anime, Zombieman is voiced by Takahiro Sakurai in Japanese and by Vernon Dew in English.

Drive Knight
, also known by his hero name, at rank 9, is a black-uniformed cyborg with a white mask face and a single eye. He is shrouded in mystery since Genos asserted that nobody knows his true origins nor goals. In the battle with the Dark Matter Thieves, he warns Genos to watch out for Metal Knight Bofoi as a possible enemy. Drive Knight uses a special box as his weapon, which he can reshape into "Tactical Transformations", each transformation a powerful weapon to deal with a certain type of situation.  He is also revealed to be a victim to Mad Cyborg as Genos and Kuseno, and Bofoi was its creator.

Drive Knight is voiced by Yōji Ueda in the Japanese version and by Todd Haberkorn in the English dub.

Pig God
, ranked 10, is an extremely fat hero typically seen eating, dressed with a dark sweater and light pants.

He is shown to have superhuman durability due to his many layers of fat, as well as either a strong resistance or complete immunity to various poisons. Additionally, he can open his mouth to a ridiculous degree, often swallowing large enemies whole.

He is voiced by Daisuke Namikawa in the Japanese version and by Marc Diraison in the English dub.

Superalloy Blackluster 
, ranked 11, is a dark-skinned bodybuilder superhero. Later, it is revealed that he is not actually dark-skinned, but light-skinned and tanned.

Not only displaying great physical strength, but Superalloy Blackluster is also the most durable superhero in S-Class. When other heroes of higher levels are shown to be wounded, Superalloy's skin appears to be undamaged. According to him, this is a result of intense bodybuilding making his muscles stronger than steel.

Blackluster is voiced by Satoshi Hino in the Japanese version and by Zeno Robinson in the English dub.

According to a Comicbook.com article, his anime character design in season 2 was criticized for being a racist caricature by viewers outside of Japan.

Watchdog Man
, at Rank 12, is a highly efficient and stoic hero in a dog costume who is charged with dealing with mysterious beings' activities in Q-City. He has a reputation of eliminating every last monster. He makes his appearance at the S-Class meeting, displaying his dog-like diligence. Watchdog Man has shown to be incredibly strong and an expert in dealing with monsters, despite his size and look. He often waits around like the Hachiko statue and sits atop a stone pedestal waiting for a monster to come at him. Garou finds Watchdog Man difficult to assess as he is more of an animal than a human in his fighting style.

He is voiced by Yūji Ueda in the Japanese version and by Arnie Pantoja in the English dub.

Flashy Flash
, ranked 13, is a feminine-looking, high-velocity hero. His two hair ornaments and a symbol on his cloak look like number signs. He moves at extreme speeds, accurately using his sword on many distant targets at once. In addition to his sword skill, Flashy Flash is also a strong hand-to-hand combatant. His abilities stem from his extensive training in the Ninja Village. Eventually, it is revealed that he caused an incident at the Ninja Village that made him the strongest ninja the village had ever produced. He also considers Sonic a friend and rival, the main reason he saved him from being massacred during the village's incident, despite their differences.

He is voiced by Kōsuke Toriumi in the Japanese version and by Lex Lang in the English dub.

Tank-Top Master
 ranked 14,, is an athletic, tank-top-clad superhero who leads an army of his brothers who also wear tank tops. Unlike his brothers who are prone to arrogance and recklessness, he is level-headed, modest, and has a strong sense of justice. Tank-Top Master is shown to have extreme strength, being able to throw gigantic slabs of concrete at an alien ship to cause substantial damage. He developed his own form of fighting, centered on his immense physical strength.

In the anime, he is voiced by Katsuyuki Konishi in the Japanese version and by Patrick Seitz in the English dub.

Metal Bat 
, also known by his hero name, ranked 15, is a superhero sporting an indestructible metal bat and street fighting skills. He is assigned to be the bodyguard of a Hero Association patron Narinki and his son. In addition to his equipment, he is shown to utilize superhuman physical strength and exudes a "fighting spirit" that lets him grow stronger as he sustains heavy injuries. Metal Bat has a large soft spot for his little sister  often trying to appeal to or spoil her. However, she often scolds him for his behavior, displaying a greater level of maturity despite their age difference. Other than his love for his sister, he is also very sympathetic like Saitama, having disagreed with other heroes about killing the opponent who is already weakened like Garou.

He is voiced by Wataru Hatano in the Japanese version and by Sam Riegel in the English dub.

Puri-Puri Prisoner
 is an openly gay superhero who prides himself in having a 10,000-year sentence for "getting grabby with men". He is usually dressed up in a prisoner's uniform with a useless ball and chain dragging behind him, and occasionally breaks out to capture criminals that he fancies, or if there are some men that he likes that are in trouble. He was at rank 16, but fell to 17 after Genos advanced. He powers up in a transformation called "Angel Style" which shows off his musculature, tearing his clothes apart, leaving him completely nude. He is shown to have great potential, learning ways to overcome opponents even in the midst of battle. He is a down to earth person, telling Saitama about the late-fortune teller and criticizing Amai Mask's treatment of the heroes' hardships.

He is voiced by Masaya Onosaka in the Japanese version and by Ray Chase in the English dub.

A-Class Superheroes
A-Class is the second strongest class of the Hero Association. Among the known A-Class superheroes are:

Amai Mask 
 is a beautiful model, singer, and actor, and the top superhero by popularity for over 28 weeks. He is very narcissistic, having a philosophy that heroes should be "tough, strong, and beautiful as well as be able to promptly and splendidly eradicate evil". He is also part of the promotion process for any rank 1 heroes who want to advance to the next class, although he mostly cares about those entering A-class or above. Despite his charismatic exterior, he has a strong hatred for anything deemed evil (including those whom he consider its accomplice), and is rather merciless, executing Boros's captured subordinates on the crash-landed alien ship, even planning to kill the brainwashed victims. He chooses to remain at A-Class, rank 1, so as to prevent other A-Class members from applying to be S-Class without his blessing as mentioned by Hellish Blizzard when she mentions how Atomic Samurai's disciples can't join their master in S-Class. Unbeknownst to everyone, Amai Mask is secretly not entirely a human, as seen when his eye stabbed on one of the Monster Association members and his entire face revealed to be as thick as a hard material that can be broken, and never bleeds, while quickly regenerating, indicating there is something inhuman about him, even Atomic Samurai's disciples begin to be suspicious about Amai Mask's true nature since witnessing him execute surviving Dark Matter Thieves in cold blood. At one point in his life, Amai Mask was saved by Blast as Amai Mask considered him his idol.

In the anime, he is voiced by Mamoru Miyano in the Japanese version and by Ben Lepley in the English dub.

Snakebite Snek 
, introduced as at the bottom of A-Class, Rank 38, wears a smoking jacket whose texture resembles the python's skin and uses a hand-to-hand snake-styled fighting style. He facilitates the seminar welcoming Saitama and Genos to the Hero Association and becomes irritated when they don't pay attention. He tries to fight Saitama afterwards and is easily defeated. In the J-City shelter, he and some other minor heroes are quickly defeated by the Deep Sea King. This, however, distracted the Deep Sea King until Genos arrived. He has participated in multiple martial arts tournaments, including the one that Saitama had entered.

In the anime, he is voiced by Shin-ichiro Miki in the Japanese version and by Kirk Thornton in the English dub.

Golden Ball and Spring Mustachio
A pair of A-Class heroes. , introduced as rank 29, wears a skullcap and a letter jacket with his name on the front and the back. He often has a lollipop in his mouth. His weapon of choice is a slingshot, which he uses to fire golden balls made of a special metal that morph into bullets of various caliber and designs. , introduced at rank 33, wears a tuxedo and has a black mustache that he likes to stroke. He uses a rapier called Tomboy that can coil like a spring and that can extend several street blocks. He and Golden Ball cooperate on missions. They later face Garo, but are defeated. In the anime, Golden Ball's slingshot has a laser sight.

Golden Ball is voiced by Sota Arai in the Japanese version and by Kaiji Tang in the English dub.

Spring Mustachio is voiced by Makoto Yasumura in the Japanese version and by David W. Collins in the English dub.

Lightning Max
, or simply known by his real name,  is a young prodigious karateka who wears a sports outfit and high-tech running shoes, has his hair slicked back to a point, and has a lightning symbol on his left cheek. He is ranked 20 in A-Class. He was called to City Z to look for the rumored monster in City Z after the creature had defeated Golden Ball and Spring Mustachio, but he came to the scene after it was already beaten by Saitama. He is among the superheroes that were defeated by the Sea King. In the Dark Matter Invasion storyline, he and Stinger assist Mumen Rider in a rescue operation. In the anime, he and Smile Man were sent to A-City at the start of the series to stop Vaccine Man, but are defeated. He later participates in the martial arts tournament but is eliminated by Suiryu.

Lightning Max is voiced by Sōichirō Hoshi in the Japanese version and by Ben Pronsky in the English dub.

Stinger
 is a popular fighter introduced as A-Class, Rank 11. He wears a tight black suit made of bandages.  He wields a spear called Bamboo Shoot. In the battle against the Clan of the Seafolk, he takes down many Clan members until the Sea King shows up and defeats him. In the Dark Matter invasion storyline, he and Lightning Max assist Mumen Rider in rescue operations. Also, he fights Grizz-Meow in the "Lost Cat" side story. In the side story "Numbers" and in a later chapter, he is listed as rank 10.

In the anime, Stinger is voiced by Tomokazu Seki in the Japanese version and by Chris Hackney in the English dub.

Atomic Samurai's disciples
Atomic Samurai has three A-Class disciples. According to Hellish Blizzard, they would've joined their master were it not for Amai Mask:

 , Rank 2, is a disciple who wears an iron helmet and wields a long sword so that he resembles a medieval knight. He accompanied Atomic Samurai to the S-Class meeting in City A, and was caught by the destruction of the city during the Dark Matter Thieves' invasion. During the fight, he loses his helmet and then his left arm to Melzargard. Ever since witnessing Amai Mask executed the surviving Dark Matter Thieves in front of Iaian and the rest of the volunteered heroes, Iaian is the first person who confirms his suspicion of Amai Mask's true nature, and currently plan a secret investigation about the #1 A-rank hero's actual background with his fellow swordsmen once the raid on Monster Association is over. Iaian is voiced by Yoshimasa Hosoya in the Japanese version and by Xander Mobus in the English dub. 
 , at rank 3, is the second of the Atomic Samurai's three disciples. He cross-dresses as a woman and uses a technique with his katana to create huge blades of wind by slashing the air. During the attack at the Monster Association, he was one of the selected heroes sent to attack the enemy headquarters. Initially found Amai Mask attractive, but eventually hate him and grow tire of his ruthless treatments towards other hardworking heroes as Okama Itachi and the rest. He fought together with Iaian and Bushi Drill against Malong Hair, killing him after a harsh battle. 
 , at rank 4, dresses like a Japanese samurai from the Edo Period and is the third of Atomic Samurai's disciples. His main weapon seems to be some sort of a great drill. During the attack at the Monster Association, he was one of the selected heroes sent to attack the enemy headquarters; he fought together with Okama Itachi and Iaian against Malong Hair, killing him after a harsh battle. While escaping from a sentient man-eating water monster, Bushi Drill was saved by a captain of the private mercenary squad whom the disciples rescued from Amai Mask’ attempt murder.

Other A-Class superheroes
 , rank 5, is a massive hero wearing only a light-colored loincloth who was called to protect Sitch in a meeting with the criminals. He is brutally beaten down by Garo when the latter began his hero hunt. He is voiced by Paul St. Peter in the English dub.
 , rank 6, wears a kung fu gi and wields small flamethrowers underneath the sleeves of his coat that he uses to burn his foes. He serves as a bodyguard to Sitch during the meeting with the criminals, but loses his hand to Garo. Blue Fire is voiced by Kyle McCarly in the English dub.
 , rank 7, is dressed like a magician with a top hat with a question mark on it. He can perform magic tricks that consist of sharp poker cards, a rainbow smokescreen, and breathe a special fluid in front of his opponents. In addition, Magicman owns a flock of white crows that will attack his opponents. Magicman serves as a bodyguard to Sitch during the meeting with the criminals. He is voiced by Robbie Daymond in the English dub where the character was called "Magic Trick Man".
 , rank 27, wears a costume with a smiling face on it. A large kendama is his main weapon. In the anime, he and Lightning Max were sent to A-City at the start of the series to stop Vaccine Man, but are battered and beaten by the monster with ease. He makes other occasional supporting appearances. In the bonus manga "Threat Level", it is revealed he has two brothers Angryman and Cryingman. Smileman is voiced by Takahiro Yamaguchi in the Japanese version and by Christian La Monte in the English dub.
 , rank 17, is a roller skate-clad superhero who fights using two stun batons. He was sent alone to D-City to investigate the monsters there. Also, he fights Grizz-Meow in the "Lost Cat" side story. Lightning Geni also fought against the outbreak of monsters in City D where his abilities couldn't work on electrical monsters Maiko Plasma and Electric Catfish Man. Lightning Genji is voiced by Gen Sato in the Japanese version and by Todd Haberkorn in the English dub.
 , rank 34, is a tall, bald-headed, bearded, and muscular man resembling a caveman and wearing a belt buckle with the word Kong on it. He watches over W City. He fought with other A-Class heroes against Grizz-Meow, but was defeated. He is also attacked by Martial Gorilla. Heavy Kong is voiced by Chris Tergliafera in the English dub.
 , rank 30, wears a samurai vest and headband with a peach on it. He and Heavy Kong fought Grizz-Meow, but were defeated. He also appears against the Monster Association. Peach Terry is voiced by Sam Riegel in the English dub.
 , rank 36, is a skilled martial artist who wears a judo suit with a frog mask on the head because he was unremarkable otherwise. The mask has made him more popular with kids. He uses a kusarigama to fight. He is seen in the battles against the Monster Association, and appears in several side stories including trying to help a police station defend itself from monsters in "Pork Cutlet Bowl", and entering a hero costume contest in "Taste". Chain Toad is voiced by Koichi Soma in the Japanese version and by Robbie Daymond in the English dub.
 Death Gatling, rank 8, has an automatic gun for his left arm. Death Gatling is voiced by Kento Shirashi in the Japanese version and by Jarred Kjack in the English dub.
 Feather, rank 34,  is dressed in feathers and long bladed claws. He is part of Sekingal's Monster lair raid support team.
 , rank 22, is a confident, level-headed fighter, only losing his cool when his weapon malfunctions. One Shooter is one of the heroes recruited to the Monster Association raid's support team. He is one of the greatest snipers in the Hero Association, as his name implies.

B-Class Superheroes
B-Class is the next tier of superheroes in the association. If a superhero in C-Class reaches Rank 1, they have the option to be promoted to B-Class. The B-Class superheroes who have recurred in the series are:

Tank-Top Blackhole 
, listed as rank 81 wears a black tank top and is one of the many brothers related to Tank-Top Master. He persuades the crowd to go against Saitama for damaging the town by shattering the meteor. He and Tank-Top Tiger then try to fight Saitama but are defeated. In the "Lost Cat" side story, he and Tank-Top Tiger were appointed to keep everyone out of a danger zone. He also joined the tank top fighters against Garo, but is defeated.

He is voiced by Atsushi Imaruoka in the Japanese version and by Joshua Tomar in the English dub.

Blizzard 
, is a woman with short dark green hair  and the top-ranking member of the B-Class heroes. She is in charge of a large faction (over 30 people) within the Hero Association called the Blizzard Bunch. As an esper, she uses an "inborn psychic ability to defeat monsters". Her older sister is Tornado, and Psykos use to be her childhood friend since high school. She is notorious for recruiting members for her group, but while she appears confident and calm on the surface, she is actually very insecure and frustrated from living in the shadow of her older sister. When she was offered a chance to enter A-Class, she refused as she would have a much harder chance to advance there, and instead recruited others in B-Class believing their collective strength would help her. When the Monster Association launches an initial attack, she finds herself having to defend against her own Blizzard Bunch who were enslaved by a dominatrix-like mutant, Do-S. She overcomes being mind-controlled and fends them off with help from Tornado, causing the monster to retreat. During the assault on Monster Association's headquarters, Blizzard is able to defeat Do-S and broke the civilian from the mutant's influence and monsterfication, with the help of Bang and Bomb.

In the anime, Blizzard is voiced by Saori Hayami in the Japanese version and by Laura Post in the English dub.

Blizzard Bunch
The  is a large faction of B-Class Superheroes that are led by Hellish Blizzard. Some of Blizzard's notable subordinates in the Blizzard Bunch are:

 , rank 2, a hero with long eyelashes wearing a black suit, is the second-in-command of the Blizzard Bunch. He fights with a pair of eyelash curlers, which can transform into a pair of long claws called Retina Awls. Eyelashes is voiced by Yoshiaki Hasegawa in the Japanese version and by Sean Chiplock in the English dub.
 , rank 3, is a very tall man wearing a black suit and is paired with Eyelashes as Blizzard's subordinates in the Blizzard Bunch. True to his name, he is specialized in super-strength. He is voiced by Shinya Hamazoe in the Japanese version. In the English dub, Wild Monkey is voiced by Greg Chun in season one and by Imari Williams in season two.
 , rank 74 in the anime, is a young woman with a flower-like hasp in her hair. She admires Blizzard. She fights with a three-section staff.

Other B-Class superheroes
 , ranked 93 in the anime, is a girl with a mushroom-styled haircut. She wears a bandit mask and mushroom-styled shoulder pads. She and fellow hero Horsebone investigated activities in City H.
 , ranked 50 in the anime, is a cyborg who resembles Mumen Rider, wearing boxing gloves. He and the other minor heroes fight Deep Sea King at the shelter, but are defeated. He gets an upgrade and joins Sekingal's support team on the Monster lair raid. Jet Nice Guy is voiced by Yoshiaki Hasagawa in the Japanese version and by Arnie Pantoja in the English dub.
 Pineapple is a superhero that's dressed like a pineapple with slice-shaped shoulder pads. He and Mohican help escort Narinki and his son away from the monsters but run into trouble with Rhino-Wrestler. Pineapple is voiced by Hiromichi Tezuka in the Japanese version and by Sean Chiplock in the English dub.
 , rank 50, is a young swordsman with a cross-shaped scar on his right cheek, wearing a black armor with fantasy decorations and fighting with a long sword. During the side story "Sense", Darkness Blade participated in the Hero Costume Contest and fought a monster that crashed the contest. He was one of the heroes that Child Emperor assessed power levels in the side story "Numbers". Darkness Blade is voiced by Ben Lepley in the English dub.
 , rank 77,  is a hero fully dressed in a tight skeleton costume. He was seen in the story involving the police station and also fighting the Monster Association when they initially attacked the city. He powers up by drinking much milk to increase his bone density.
 Captain Mizuki, rank 71,  is a woman remaining dressing as a track-and-field athlete, including three medals, due to her former profession prior to being a hero. She first appears in the Monster Association raid story as a support member. She uses track-and-field items for weapons such as a javelin, a hammer, a relay race baton, and a pole vault pole. She can also grapple if need be. 
 Needlestar, rank 60,   is usually seen chewing bubblegum and blowing bubbles.

C-Class Superheroes
C-Class is the lowest tier of the Hero Association. Members must regularly perform weekly heroic acts, usually those of helping civilians or fighting petty criminals. Those who are inactive for one week are removed from the Hero Registry. Among the notable C-Class superheroes are:

Mumen Rider  
,, known by his hero name , initially listed as Class-C, Rank 1 is a bicycle-riding hero. He first appears against Hammerhead and the Paradisers, and although he is defeated, he is given credit for defeating them. He is a parody of Kamen Rider. Despite not being physically strong, Mumen Rider is the epitome of the indomitable human spirit, often throwing himself into dangerous situations without hesitation in order to save others, even if it means his death. He befriends Saitama during and after the battle with the Deep Sea King, and is one of the first few heroes to acknowledge the latter's true strength. Unaware to both heroes, he and Saitama happened to attend a same middle school, where Satoru begin to act like a hero, calling himself a "Nameless Bicycle Commuter". During Dark Matter Thieves' invasion at A-City, Mumen Rider lead the rescue operations, accompanied by the A-rank heroes Stinger and Lightning Max. In a battle against Garo, he stops Tank-Top Master from injuring Garo further, although that enables Garo to counterattack and defeat Tank-Top Master as well as the entire tank top gang and Rider himself, then lastly, Bang's disciple, Charanko. He is visited by Saitama in the hospital, where they and by extend, Tank-Top Master discuss about Garo. When one of the Monster Associations invade the hospital where Mumen Rider and the rest of injured heroes are resting, Mumen Rider volunteer himself as a bait to lure the Monster into being trapped by Tank-Top Master's sneak attack. As the news of Monster Association's HQ being exposed at Saitama's neighborhood, Mumen Rider and the rest of the injured heroes begin to rush towards the battlefield where other heroes presented and rescue the civilians, despite knowing their current injured states.

In the anime, Mumen Rider is voiced by Yuichi Nakamura in the Japanese version and by Robbie Daymond in the English dub.

Tank-Top Tiger
, introduced as C-Class, Rank 6, wears a tank top and hair colored in a tiger animal print. He accuses Saitama of being a villain because he was rushing around town searching for bad guys for the purpose of maintaining his C-Class position. However, he is defeated by Sonic. He has several older tank-top wearing brothers who are in the association. After a giant meteor was destroyed by Saitama, Tank-Top Tiger and Tank-Top Blackhole confronted Saitama in front of a crowd of people. They tried to attack Saitama only to be easily defeated by him. In the "Lost Cat" side story, he and Tank-Top Blackhole were appointed to keep everyone out of a danger zone. He also joined the tank top fighters against Garo, but is defeated.

Tank-top Tiger is voiced by Hiromu Miyazaki in the Japanese version and by Chris Tergliafera in the English dub.

Other C-Class superheroes

Staff members

Agoni
 is the founder of the Hero Association; he appears as an old man in a business suit with an enormous cleft chin. Three years prior to the series, his grandson was attacked by Crablante but was saved by a passing stranger (actually Saitama). He creates the Hero Association and the Superhero Registry to manage the superheroes who would protect humanity against supervillains, monsters, and other threats to the world.

Sitch
 is the Disaster Prophecies Measures Committee Chairman for the Hero Association. He is a short, middle-aged man dressed with a dark suit, grey hair and a big nose. He is first seen in the Rumored Monster arc, discussing with other Hero Association members about the investigations being perpetrated by heroes in the various cities, in order to prevent eventual monsters activity. During the S-Class meeting, Sitch informs the S-Class members about the final prophecy of Madame Shibabawa, which predicted a disaster level "God" threat that will cause the destruction of whole humanity in the next six months. He later attempts to recruit potential superheroes from a group of criminals, but runs in trouble when Garo appears and declares himself to be the top villain.

Sitch is voiced by Nobuo Tobita in the Japanese version and by Kirk Thornton in the English dub.

Narinki 
 is a Hero Association Executive and prominent sponsor, having made contributions to cover 7% of the association's expenses. He is a short man with a big nose and large lips. He has a son named Waganma who also has his traits. He and Waganma are attacked by the Monster Association, and his son is abducted.

Narinki is voiced by Koichi Soma in the Japanese version and by Paul St. Peter in the English dub.

Sekingal  
 is an administrative member of the Hero Association who leads the rescue mission for Waganma. He has a cybernetic eye that can shoot a laser beam. During the attack on the Monster lair, he reveals that he had failed the Heroes Association exam.

Villains and monsters
The villains are classified by their bounties from C-class to A-class. The monsters in the series are categorized by five threat levels: God (can cause human extinction), Dragon (can destroy multiple towns), Demon (can destroy a town), Tiger (can cause massive loss of life), and Wolf (generally dangerous). According to the bonus manga "Threat Level", Demon is the equivalent of an S-Class hero, Tiger is A-Class, and Wolf is B-Class.

Vaccine Man
 appears in the start of the story, a life-form spawned from the massive pollution of the earth who considered it his mission is to eradicate the virus known as humanity. He took out two superheroes before being slain by Saitama.

In the anime, Vaccine Man is voiced by Ryusei Nakao in the Japanese version and by Christopher R. Sabat in the English dub.

Crablante
 is a mutant humanoid resembling a humanoid crab from the waist up. Originally a human, he transformed into Crablante because he ate too many crabs, and then went on a murderous rampage to get revenge on a boy who drew nipples on his chest while he was asleep. His defeat resulted in both Saitama's resolve to become a superhero and the boy's grandfather Agoni establishing the Hero Association.

In the anime, Crablante is voiced by Yukitoshi Tokumoto in the Japanese version and by Chris Cason in the English dub.

Fukegao and Marugori
Fukegao is a mad scientist with aspirations of world domination who creates an enlargement drink that transforms Marugori, who desired to become the strongest person on the world, into a mutated  giant. Fukego was accidentally crushed by Marugori who would later be slain by Saitama.

Fukegao is voiced by Takuma Suzuki in the Japanese version  and by Kirk Thornton in the English dub. Marugori is voiced by Shinya Hamazoe in the Japanese version and by Bryce Papenbrook in the English dub.

Subterraneans  
The  are a race of underground creatures that live below Z-City. While sleeping, Saitama dreamed a scenario where the Subterraneans rise up to wreak havoc and massacre 70% of the population, with the  being an especially powerful opponent. But the Subterraneans are actually weaklings with Saitama easily killing the Subterranean King when they attempt to invade. The rest of them fled back underground.

The Subterranean King was voiced by Yōji Ueda in the Japanese version and by Kirk Thornton in the English dub.

House of Evolution 
The  are a group created to further human evolution using genetic manipulation, and take over the world. It is led by Dr. Genus. Following their defeat by Saitama, Genus and Armored Gorilla open up a takoyaki stand. It is revealed that S-rank superhero Zombieman was one of Genus's creations.

Mosquito Girl
 is a voluptuous insectoid mosquito woman who can telepathically command mosquitoes within a range of 50 km to drain every living being in sight. She uses the blood acquired by the mosquitos to regenerate her limbs and become stronger. Genos had difficulty fighting her until Mosquito Girl was killed by Saitama.

Mosquito Girl is voiced by Miyuki Sawashiro in the Japanese version, and by Cristina Valenzuela in the English dub.

Doctor Genus  
 is a genius scientist and child prodigy who became disillusioned with humanity for being primitive in his eyes, later establishing the House of Evolution to "bring true humanity and evolution in the world" through genetic manipulation. When he was 70 years old, he made himself young and then created a number of clones to serve as his assistants.

Genus is voiced by Daisuke Namikawa in the Japanese version and by Ray Chase in the English dub.

Armored Gorilla
 is a large cyborg gorilla. After being defeated by Genos and discovering that Beast King was killed by Saitama, Armored Gorilla surrenders and reveals information about the House of Evolution, so Genos spares his life. Later, he helps Dr. Genus transform the House of Evolution into a takoyaki restaurant. In the anime, he makes a short cameo together with Doctor Genus when the Dark Matter Thieves attacked A-City, watching the report on TV. During the Monster Association attacks, he encounters Martial Gorilla who accuses him of assimilating with humans. Armored Gorilla knocks out Martial Gorilla when he attacks him. Eventually, he indirectly leads Zombieman to learn how the House of Evolution had fallen and immediately reformed.

In the anime, he is voiced by Shōta Yamamoto in the Japanese version and by Kaiji Tang in the English dub.

Carnage Kabuto
 is an insectoid rhinoceros beetle that is the House of Evolution's ultimate creature. He is dangerously powerful and smart, easily outclassing all of the other creations of Doctor Genus. Despite his level of intelligence however, Carnage Kabuto had been deemed mentally unstable by Doctor Genus, and as such, remained chained and imprisoned within the House of Evolution's basement. Carnage Kabuto was slain by Saitama.

He was voiced by Unshou Ishizuka in the Japanese version, and is voiced by Mike McFarland in the English dub.

Other House of Evolution creations
Other creations include:
  is an insectoid mantis who accompanied Armored Gorilla in a plot to abduct Saitama only to be killed by Saitama. He was voiced by Yoshiaki Hasegawa in the Japanese version and by Kyle Hebert in the English dub.
  is a small, dumpy-looking slug mutant with telepathic abilities who accompanied Armored Gorilla in a plot to abduct Saitama. He was accidentally killed by Beast King. Slugerous was voiced by Shinya Hamazoe in the Japanese version and by Chris Cason in the English dub.
  is an anthropomorphous frog mutant with a scar on his face, who wears a wide belt and black pants. He accompanied Armored Gorilla in a plot to abduct Saitama. He was voiced by Horoki Gotō in the Japanese version and by Kirk Thornton in the English dub.
  is a small mole mutant who accompanied Armored Gorilla in a plot to abduct Saitama. After Beast King was slain, Ground Dragon tried to burrow away only for Saitama to appear underground and slay him. He was voiced by Shinya Hamazoe in the Japanese version and by Benjamin Diskin in the English dub.
  is a large, muscled, bipedal lion mutant who wears fur suits and iron necklaces. As the second strongest creation of Dr. Genus, Beast King accompanied Armored Gorilla in a plot to abduct Saitama. After a tough battle, Beast King is slain by Saitama causing Armored Gorilla to surrender. Beast King was voiced by Jirō Saitō in the Japanese version and by Paul St. Peter in the English dub.

Hammerhead 
He is seven feet tall and weighs 462 pounds, and was known to have beaten 20 men at once. Although he is stabbed in the back of his head by one of Sonic's knives, he survives because of his thick skull. He has a hardened battle suit he stole from an unspecified organization, but it is destroyed by Saitama. After being defeated by Saitama and surviving an assassination attempt from the unknown organization representatives, he resolves to look for a job, and is seen in later chapters preparing for a job interview or filling out a job application. In the webcomic, Hammerhead is seen working with Puri-Puri Prisoner.

Hammerhead is voiced by Wataru Takagi in the Japanese version and by Edward Bosco in the English dub.

Speed-o'-Sound Sonic 
 is first introduced as a ninja bodyguard for the rich man Zeniru. He is deployed to fight the Paradisers. He warns them that when he fights, he kills his opponent. He is incredibly fast although Saitama and Genos think his full name is redundant, uses ninja weapons such as kunai throwing knives and a sword that can behead people and slice things. Although his first fight with Saitama results in his crotch accidentally landing on Saitama's fist, he vows to return and defeat Saitama. He declares himself Saitama's official rival and challenges him many times throughout the series, but he almost always suffers some sort of embarrassing defeat.  He was imprisoned as Prisoner 4188 but escapes with Puri-Puri Prisoner. When Sitch gathers villains to recruit for superheroes, he is one of the first to publicly decline and leave. He is the remaining ninja from his village Final 44. When he is recruited by Tempest Wind and Hellfire Flame to join the Monster Association, he accepts their Monster Cells, but since he had already cooked them, they were ineffective. It is revealed that both Sonic and Flash were once childhood friends, and Flash spared him out of respect for their friendships, feeding him with food poisoning. After he and Flash kills all members of Heavenly Ninja Party (the revived re-humanized Tempest Wind and Hellfire Flame included), they are gifted by Saitama each ultimate Ninja weapons confiscated from Ninja Village Leader's hand. Sonic and Flash end up having clashes each other over their respective point of view about Saitama, whereas Sonic plan to kill Flash after Saitama is dealt with. Sonic reveals his reason to resent heroes is particularly because of Blast massacres almost every juniors at Graduation Exam mercilessly in inhuman ways, with Sonic and Flash are one of the surviving juniors.

In the anime, Sonic is voiced by Yūki Kaji in the Japanese version and by Erik Scott Kimerer in the English dub.

Kombu Infinity
 is a kombu (a type of Japanese seaweed) monster who manipulates its tentacles like whips. Kombu Infinity travels to Z City, hoping to become a notorious monster and have a title like Ghost Town Monster. It easily defeats A-Class heroes Golden Ball and Spring Mustachio, but is defeated by Saitama who had randomly encountered him after a grocery shopping trip, and is stripped of all its tentacles to make kombu soup.

Kombu is voiced by Ami Naitō in the Japanese version and by Tara Sands in the English dub.

and others
He is a large, muscular piscine humanoid adorned with a crown and a royal cape. He easily defeats Stinger and Lightning Max, and is hardly bothered by Puri-Puri Prisoner. While strong on dry land, being hydrated enables the Deep Sea King to assume his true appearance and power. He can project corrosive spit and unleash a moray tongue that has a little mouth at its end. In the anime, he is voiced by Rikiya Koyama in Japanese, and by Keith Silverstein in English.
Awakening from his 300 million-year slumber, the Ancient King decides to take advantage of the deaths of the Subterranean King and the Deep Sea King. He does a number on the military before being slain by Tornado. Ancient King was voiced by Hiroki Gotō in the Japanese version and by Jamieson Price in the English dub.
 The  was a flying villain who briefly appeared atop City A to take advantage of the deaths of the Deep Sea King and the other kings to attack S-class headquarters. He and his Skyfolk subordinates were all easily killed by Melzargard when the Dark Matter Thieves began their own assault on the city. He was voiced by Christopher Corey Smith in the English dub.

Dark Matter Thieves 
The  are a group of aliens operating as space pirates that raid planets for their resources. They consist of:

  is the leader of the Dark Matter Thieves and self-proclaimed subjugator of the universe, a large cyclops alien with spiky hair whose armor limits his abilities. Like Saitama, Boros suffered a self-imposed existential crisis because of his vast power and sought to find a worthy opponent who can give him a desired fight. His search led him to Earth. He went into battle against Saitama where their battle went long until Saitama managed to slay Boros. Before dying. Boros complimented Saitama for being a worthy opponent. Boros is voiced by Toshiyuki Morikawa, and by Chris Jai Alex in the English dub.
  is an amorphous humanoid alien with five marble-sized cores contained in each of his heads. He cuts off Iaion's left forearm before being killed in battlee against Metal Bat, Puri-Puri Prisoner, Atomic Samurai, and Bang. Melzargard was voiced by Kōki Uchiyama in the Japanese version. In the English dub, he was voiced by Vic Mignogna in the anime series and by Kellen Goff in One Punch Man: A Hero Nobody Knows.
  is a humanoid with a Venus flytrap for a head and hands. He went up against Saitama and was slain by him. He was voiced by Shinya Hamazoe in the Japanese version and by Bill Rogers in the English dub.
  is a shadowy, squid-like esper that can use telekinesis that serves as the right-hand alien of Boros. He was slain when Saitama threw a small rock through his head. He was voiced by Hiroki Gotō in the Japanese version and by Brian Beacock in the English dub.

Garo 

 is a self-titled  and a former disciple, and adopted grandson of Bang before he was expelled for mercilessly beating up his fellow disciples, preferring to use his master's former fighting style, Fist of Unleashed Explosive as a last resort. As a child, he is a social outcast as he sympathizes with monsters and sees heroes as bullies who prey on misfits. He infiltrates a martial arts tournament by posing as a competitor named Wolfman whom he subdued and wins using his identity. In the main storyline, he first appears among an assembly of criminals whom Sitch tries to recruit to support the Hero Association. He defeats the criminals and heroes alike, and then assumes a "Hero Killer" role, defeating a number of members of the Hero Association, although he is later unknowingly knocked out by Saitama. He befriends a boy named Tareo who holds a magazine that profiles the heroes. Following his attacks on Metal Bat and Watchdog Man, the latter forcing him to retreat, Garo is injured by Saitama while attempting to attack King. After being nearly killed by Genos, Bang, and Bomb, he is taken to the Monster Association to be recruited, but refuses the offer. He loses to Orochi and is enchained, until he was rescued by Puri-Puri Prisoner. He accidentally touches God's hand and transforms into his misanthropic avatar that destroys almost all the heroes. He later realizes his mistakes and offers Saitama to copy his ability to allow the latter to travel back in time to restore his former self, the heroes, and the universe. Thanks to Saitama and Tareo, Garo reconciles with Bang and restarts his new life with him.

In the anime, Garou is voiced by Hikaru Midorikawa in the Japanese version and by Greg Chun in the English dub.

Monster Association
The  is a group of monsters who have assembled against the Hero Association, some of its members being humans that mutated from ingesting .

Some of its notable members include:

  is the figurehead leader of the Monster Association, formerly an antisocial human and combat genius who Psykos mutated through a special "growth"-stimulating process to break his limit of growth. Due to Psykos's modifications, Orochi can transform his body into more monstrous forms and can absorbs opponents to gain their energy and powers. Furious over his defeat by Saitama, Orochi devoured most of the remaining monsters before converging on Psykos to absorb her. But she manages to take control over his body and uses it to fight the heroes before eventually separating from Orochi when they are overpowered by the heroes and Orochi is killed by Tornado. He is voiced by Atsushi Ono in the Japanese version and by Jason Marnocha in the English dub.
  is an esper who is the Monster Association's true leader. She is a former high school friend of Blizzard's until the latter seals her power. She resolves to kill all humans after having a vision of humanity's future. She recruits and experiments on Orochi, and allows him to run the Monster Association while monitoring under her meat-puppet alias, a one-eyed slug-like monster with multiple arms protruding from the head who uses eye creatures for observation and to remotely communicate with others. Psykos loses her disguise and ends up being temporary fused with Orochi when he tries to devour her, eventually separating from him when the heroes overpower them while Tornado readies a finishing blow. After being defeated, Psykos is placed in a secret prison within A-City. Gyoro-Gyoro is voiced by Takehito Koyasu in the Japanese version and by Bill Millsap in the English dub.
 Centipede Monsters - There are three human-faced centipede monsters in the Monster Association.
  is a great human-faced centipede monster who surfaces from underground to attack the Hero Association's sponsor Narinki and his son at a restaurant. Centikohai was accompanied by Venus Mantrap. He was slain by Metal Bat. Centikohai was voiced by Takahiro Yamaguchi in the Japanese version and by Joshua Tomar in the English dub.
  is a centipede monster with multiple human faces who appears and takes Centikohai's place as a stronger opponent. After Centikohai and Venus Mantrap were slain, Centisenpai appeared to help in finishing the assignment of attacking Narinki and his son where his fellow monster Rafflesidon used sleeping gas on Narinki and his son. He was slain by Metal Bat. Centisenpai was voiced by Hiromichi Tezuka in the Japanese version and by Imari Willians in the English dub.
  is a gigantic human-faced centipede monster who was once brought to the brink of death in his fight against Blast. Having since joined the Monster Association and becoming one of its executives, Centichoro arrives following Centisenpai's defeat and fights off Metal Bat, hurling him out of range so he has to fight Garo and then fights Metal Knight. When Rhino-Wrestler finishes the assignment that the other monsters failed at by capturing Narinki's son, Centichoro digs a tunnel for them to escape. Summoned by Phoenix Man, Centichoro fights Genos, Bang, and Bomb so that Phoenix Man can safely bring Garo to Orochi. When he charges towards King, Centichoro is destroyed by Saitama who allows King to take the credit. Centichoro is voiced by Naoki Bandō in the Japanese version and by Richard Epcar in the English dub.
  is a phoenix with the ability to revive himself and others, or alter his body for specialized attacks. He was formerly a costumed actor who was fired after his show was canceled, ending up in his current form as the result of continuous wearing his costume until it fused with his body. While arrogant in his abilities, his diplomatic demeanor enables him to serve as the Monster Association's middleman. Phoenix Man first appears during the Association's kidnapping of Narinki's son. He later crashes Garo's fight with Genos, Bang, and Bomb, to carry off Garo. He later engages Child Emperor during the Hero Association's raid, reviving Subterraneans to aid him before eventually being defeated and reduced to a chick form because of Saitama's presence where he became Monster Chick Man. Phoenix Man is voiced by Hiroki Maeda in the Japanese version and by Jonah Scott in the English dub.
  is a monster which looks like a walking blob with two eyes, similar to a jellyfish, with a goop-like skin and various filaments. He seems to have great regenerative capacities and the ability to flow even through the smallest cracks, thanks to his insubstantial body. He made his first appearance, together with Phoenix Man and Rhino-Wrestler, when they stopped Pineapple and Mohican who were removing the unconscious Hero Association's sponsor and his son from the scene. Sludge Jellyfish later crashed the battle between Child Emperor and Evil Natural Water and is accidentally killed by the latter who absorbed his oils. Sludge Jellyfish is voiced by Tadanori Date in the Japanese version and by Jason Marnocha in the English dub.
  is an anthropomorphic Indian rhinoceros dressed like a professional wrestler and is part of the Monster Association. He asserted that he trained his body as hard as he could, holding back his blood lust to reach the objective of eradicate every existing hero. Rhino-Wrestler was able to stop Pineapple and Mohican and abduct Hero Association-sponsor Narinki's son. He later appears at the entrance to the Monster lair to fend off Sekingal's support team of A and B-class Heroes but is easily destroyed by Atomic Samurai. Rhino Wrestler is voiced by Ryou Sugisaki in the Japanese version and by Richard Epcar in the English dub.
  is a gorilla monster dressed in a military outfit with a beret and a cigar; he fights using a military knife. During the Monster Association attacks, he defeats Heavy Kong. He later encounters Armored Gorilla and accuses him of assimilating with the humans, but is knocked out. Marshal Gorilla is voiced by Sōshirō Hori in the Japanese version and by Brock Powell in the English dub.
  is an enlarged electric catfish with human arms and legs and lightning-shaped mustaches, which possesses the ability to emit electricity. When many of the members of the Monster Association appeared and simultaneously attacked various cities, Electric Catifish Man attacked D-City with Maiko Plasma and they both fought Lighting Genji, proving difficult since his electric attacks had no effect on them. During the fight between the Hero Association and the Monster Association, Electric Catfish Man and Maiko Plasma fight against Puri-Puri-Prisoner until they are absorbed by Vacuuma who consumes them to gain their powers. Electric Catfish Man is voiced by Patrick Seitz in the English dub.
  is a monster which looks like a typical geisha with eight tomoe drums on her back and possessing the ability to emit electricity. When many of the members of the Monster Association appeared and simultaneously attacked various cities, Maiko Plasma attacked D-City together with Electric Catfish Man and they both fought Lighting Genji, proving difficult since his electric attacks had no effect on them. During the fight between the Hero Association and the Monster Association, Maiko Plasma and Electric Catfish Man fight against Puri-Puri-Prisoner until Vacuuma shows up and consumes Maiko and some other monsters to gain their powers. Maiko Plasma is voiced by Risa Tsumugi in the Japanese version and by Lauren Landa in the English dub.
  is an ancestral and powerful vampire who claims to be the only "true" monster in the Association, having been born into an elder vampire family and feeding on human blood since his childhood. He is fast enough to catch bullets while seemingly not moving. When many of the members of the Monster Association appeared and simultaneously attacked various cities, Pureblood and his comrades attacked a random city. During the fight between the Hero Association and the Monster Association, he encountered Zombieman. After a hard battle, he was killed by Zombieman who was able to win the fight thanks to his immense regenerative capacity. Vampire (Pureblood) is voiced by Doug Erholtz in the English dub.
  is a female dominatrix monster of the Monster Association who uses her whip to turn her opponents into love slaves. She enslaves the Blizzard Bunch, but Fubuki herself resists. After failing to control Atomic Samurai's disciples, she pretends to surrender to Amai Mask in order to poke his eyes, but after seeing that Amai Mask is not human, Amai Mask crushes her head. She survives and vows to unmask his true nature when the time comes. In the anime series, she is voiced by Natsumi Fujiwara in the Japanese version and by Wendee Lee in the English dub.
  is a cat that was turned into a cat monster upon becoming sadistic and became one of the Monster Association's executives. During the attacks by the Monster Association, Nyan attacked Smelly Lid Prison to find Puri-Puri-Prisoner only to be unable to find him. This caused Nyan to make a deal with the prisoners and infect them with Monster Cells. During the Hero Association's raid on the Monster Association's headquarters, Nyan is defeated by Drive Knight. When Genos arrived, he found a defeated Nyan still in Drive Knight's hand as Drive Knight plans to dissect him later. Nyan is voiced by Christian la Monte in the English dub.
  is a fierce four-eyed monster who was the first Super Fight champion defeated by the monsters and then captured. Goketsu was offered monster powers to make himself stronger. The monster cells transform Goketsu and he becomes one of the Monster Association's executives. He defeats Genos and then offers the monster cells to the tournament fighters. He is killed off-screen by Saitama's punch, with his head landing in front of an already badly beaten Suiryu. Goketsu is voiced by Kenji Nomura in the Japanese version and by Kellen Goff in the English dub.
In the Monster Association arc, they fight Flashy Flash, who eventually slew them in their dragon-level monster forms. Later, Phoenix Man resurrects the two as zombies to assist his fight against Child Emperor in addition to a bunch of fodder monsters. Child Emperor hits the zombies with a powerful electrical shock, destroying the fodder monsters but defibrillating the two ninja warriors from their hypnosis. They then leave and briefly encounter Saitama, who finds them weird due to the shock also destroying their clothing, leaving them naked. They vow to kill Saitama after they first kill Flash, then leave. Tempest Wind is voiced by Tashi Murata in the Japanese version and by Grant George in the English dub. Hellfire Flame is voiced by Yasuaki Takumi in the Japanese version and by Tim Friedlander in the English dub.
  is a diminutive monster who is an executive in the Monster Association. After the Monster Association was defeated, Black Sperm became one of Saitama's pets. Black Sperm is voiced by Yuichiro Umehara in the Japanese version and by Jalen K. Cassell in the English dub.
  is a watery monster who is an executive in the Monster Association. When Evil Natural Water combined with the ocean, it became Evil Ocean Water. Saitama's punch was able to defeat it and Evil Natural Water was swallowed by Pig God.
  is an Ugmon who is an executive in the Monster Association. Thanks to a trick by Bang, Fuhrer Ugly was swallowed by Gums causing Fuhrer Ugly to kill Gums by breaking out of its stomach. Fuhrer Ugly was later killed by Garou.
  is an executive in the Monster Association. After being tricked by Bang, Gums ate Fuhrer Ugly who killed it by breaking out of its stomach.
  is a disheveled human who is an executive of the Monster Association and had received his energy-projection powers from "God". He fought Zombieman before being killed by "God" who took away his powers.
  is a black six-eyed dog who is an executive of the Monster Association. After the Monster Association was defeated, Overgrown Rover became one of Saitama's pets.

"God"
A Mysterious Being of unknown power, it appears to be Blast and possibly indirectly Saitama's archenemy making him the main antagonist of the series. When a human who abandoned their humanity touched its body, this Mysterious Being is capable of granting massive power increases to beings such as Homeless Emperor, Orochi, and Psykos in exchange for loyalty to it, whom all, in turn, consider this being as a God. With no real concrete form, it generally appears as a gigantic, nightmarish humanoid form with no face, though when making offers of power, it can appear as someone important to the person offered power, though that form also has no face. Despite some human villains wanting to be monsters of their own rights after refusing God's offer, accidentally touching its body parts would still transform them into monstrous states by force as with Garo.

Other characters

Kuseno 
 is a scientist of justice who transformed Genos into a cyborg. In the anime he appears as a strange old man in a lab coat, with grey hair styled in the shape of a mushroom cap. Though he supports Genos in the latter's quest to avenge his family and hometown, he also implies that he wishes for Genos to give up on revenge and work to protect people instead, despite Kuseno himself admit that he never forgive Bofoi and Mad Cyborg for what they did to his family as well. Ever since Saitama came to Genos' life and both became full-fledge heroes, Kuseno entrust the former to look after the latter in his stead, should anything happen to the doctor. During Neo Heroes era, where Kuseno requires Saitama to research on the bald heroes's true potential for a while, he is killed by a group of cyborg assassins, presumably sent by either Mad Cyborg or Bofoi. As the robot invasion begins, a dying Kuseno leaves a final upgrade for Genos, and made a final request to end the terrors of both Mad Cyborg and Bofoi once and for all.

In the anime, Kuseno is voiced by Kenichi Ogata in Japanese, and by Doug Stone in English.

Zeniru
 is a slightly rotund middle-aged multi-millionaire established in F-City, with a strange short curly type of hair. He wears an open bath robe, which reveals a hairy chest and a chain necklace. He hires Sonic as his bodyguard to take out the Paradisers, and allows Sonic to kill them.

He is voiced by Hiroki Gotō in the Japanese version and by Kirk Thornton in the English dub.

Shibabawa
 is an old decrepit lady renowned for being a great fortune teller who resided in G-City, which appeared on television on a few occasions. Even though she only predicted a fraction of disasters and there were many that she could not foresee, her predictions were 100% accurate. Therefore, she received special treatment from the Hero Association itself, such as personal escorts. Shibabawa later died from a coughing fit that led to her choking on her cough drops after making a prediction about a God-level threat that would come in the next six months.

She is voiced by Kimiko Saitō in the Japanese version and by Barbara Goodson in the English dub.

Charanko 
 is the sole martial artist at Bang's dojo. He joined and trained in martial arts in order to become popular but did not amount to much and was given most of the menial tasks such as wiping the floors. He worked for a year until Bang's other disciples quit, making him the "number-one disciple". He tries to fight Garo but is defeated and hospitalized. He then gives his contestant ticket for the martial arts tournament to Saitama, who impersonates him.

He is voiced by Toshiki Masuda in the Japanese version and by Todd Haberkorn in the English dub.

Bomb
 is Bang's older brother and a powerful martial arts master. Bomb is also the main reason behind Bang's redemption during their last younger days, leading his younger brother to renew his fighting style as it is today and open his dojo before being recruited to Hero Association in the present, sometimes before Saitama join the said hero organization. When Garo's "hero hunting" first occur, Bomb originally offers Bang his assistant, but Bang decline because Garo's downfall into walking a similar path as the latter's younger-self was his responsibility. When Garo's "hero hunting" becomes worsen, Bang have no other options to come to his dojo to accept his big brother's offer stop his former disciple, and Bomb agrees, finding Garo as a possible future threat for his own dojo as well.

He is voiced by Shinya Fukumatsu in the Japanese version and by Brook Chalmers in the English dub.

Sourface
 is a rather large muscular man with a huge and hostile face which is a professional martial artist always dressed with a white gi. Sourface was once a disciple of Bang, but left after Garo rampaged through the dojo; sometime afterwards, he created the Sourface-style Kempo martial arts and started his own dojo. He meets Saitama at the martial arts tournament thinking that he is talking to Charanko.

He is voiced by Itaru Yamamoto in the Japanese version and by Armen Taylor in the English dub.

Waganma
 is the son of Hero Association staffer Narinki. He is abducted by the Monster Association. He meets Tareo briefly when the latter is captured. When Child Emperor rescues him, he remarks how cool Child Emperor's items are.

Waganma is voiced by Ayaka Shimizu in the Japanese version and by Morgan Berry in the English dub.

Suiryu
 is a young man with tan skin and a low ponytail, he wears a traditional black uniform used in Chinese martial arts with star-like buttons. He had won four consecutive Super Fight tournaments before, as he is an incredibly powerful martial artist, utilizing the Void Fist style. He is very popular and has lot of female admirers, but does not want to be a hero, preferring to be a free spirit. He advances to the finals in the tournament that Saitama entered, but is unable to beat Saitama. However, he wins when Saitama is disqualified officially, yet still unsatisfied because of his recent encounter with Saitama. Shortly afterwards when the Monster Association converts many of martial artists with deeper darker sides into monsters, just as Suiryu's losing his strength and unable to fight the last of them (namely Goketsu and a recently monsterized Bakuzan), he cries for help and Saitama rescues him after which he vows to become a hero. When the news of Monster Association's HQ has been exposed to the surface at a location where Saitama life, just as the rest of the heroes who were injured from the previous battle rushes toward the battlefield and rescue civilians, Suiryu is aware of his fellow surviving martial artists wanted to aid the heroes, but sadly their mental state still traumatized, advising them to train both physics and mentalities first as the means to be a real hero. After the fall of Monster Association, just as Hero Association is at a brick of critical situation by some heroes' current awful statuses, Suiryu was invited to a new organization called Neo Heroes, whereas his sister, Suiko join the Hero Association to honor their late-grandfather, Suicho.

In the anime, Suiryu is voiced by Masaya Matsukaze in the Japanese version and by Alan Lee in the English dub.

Suiko
 is a girl with tan skin and short black hair, a younger sister of Suiryu who trained in the same fighting style as their grandfather, Suicho. She visited her brother at the hospital, sometimes after the latter was rescued by Saitama, while watching the Monster Association's headquarters being discovered by Heroes Association's Tatsumaki to the world. After Monster Association's downfall, Suiko joins the Hero Association, while Suiryu joins Neo Heroes to honor her late grandfather.

Tareo
Tareo is a child who has a guidebook to the Heroes. He is a loner whose classmates tend to bully or take advantage of. Garo befriends him.
He is voiced by Natsumi Fujiwara in the Japanese version and by Jeannie Tirado in the English dub.

Works cited
   "Ch." and "Vol." are shortened forms for chapter and volume in the One-Punch Man manga
  "Web ch." is shortened form for web chapter and refers to the online web chapter of One-Punch Man
  "Ep." is shortened form for an episode and refers to an episode number of the One-Punch Man anime

Notes

References

External links
 Anime official website characters list 

One-Punch Man
One-Punch Man